The national museums of Canada are the nine museums in Canada designated under the federal Museums Act and operated by the Government of Canada. The national museums are responsible for "preserving and promoting the heritage of Canada and all its peoples" and serving as "a source of inspiration, research, learning and entertainment... in both official languages." 

There are many other museums owned and operated by the Canadian federal government that are not considered national museums. The Bank of Canada Museum in Ottawa, Correctional Service of Canada Museum in Kingston, and the National Historic Sites of Canada operated by Parks Canada across the country are all examples of museums administered by federal agencies but outside the national museums system.

History

Origins
The concept of a "National Museum" in Canada had its beginnings on May 16, 1856, when the government of the Province of Canada authorized the Geological Survey of Canada to establish a Geological Museum in Montreal (then, the capital of the province). Once moved to Ottawa, the museum's scope gradually expanded; the National Museum of Canada was officially created from the Museum Branch of the federal Department of Mines on January 5, 1927.

National Museums of Canada Corporations
The National Museums of Canada Corporation (NMC) was created in 1967. It included: The National Gallery of Canada Corporation, the Canadian Museum of Civilization Corporation, the Canadian Museum of Nature Corporation, and the National Museum of Science and Technology Corporation (now the Canada Science and Technology Museum Corporation). The Canadian Conservation Institute, the Museum Assistance Program, The National Museum Library, and other miscellaneous museum and administrative offices were also under the NMC umbrella. The corporation was formalized under The National Museums Act which took effect on 1 April 1968. The NMC operated until 1988.

List of museums
There are currently nine museums included in the national museums system. Of these nine, seven are located in the National Capital Region, one in Western Canada, and one in Atlantic Canada. Four of the museums are incorporated as independent Crown corporations that report to Parliament through the Minister of Canadian Heritage. The Canadian Museum of History Corporation manages the Canadian War Museum and Canadian Museum of History and a sixth Crown corporation, Ingenium, manages the three museums focused on applied sciences.

See also
 List of museums in Canada
 List of museums in Ottawa
 Provincial and territorial museums of Canada
 Canadian Museums Association

Notes

References

External links
Canadian Museum of Civilization Corporation
Canada Science and Technology Museum Corporation
Canadian Museum of Nature corporate reports
National Gallery of Canada corporate reporting

 
Department of Canadian Heritage